The Statute Law Revision Act 1893 (Canada) (30 & 31 Vict c 3) is a section of an Act of the Parliament of the United Kingdom that deals exclusively with Canada through the repeal of several clauses of the British North America Act 1867.

Schedule
The Schedule repeals several clauses, including the enactment clause of the British North America Act, 1867 (later renamed the Constitution Act, 1867):

Reign and Chapter

30 & 31 Vict. c. 3

The British North America Act, 1867

In part; namely,

 From "Be it therefore" to "same as follows."
 Section two.
 Section four to "provisions" where it last occurs.
 Section twenty-five.
 Sections forty-two and forty-three.
 Section fifty-one, from "of the census" to "seventy-one and" and the word "subsequent."
 Section eighty-one.
 Section eighty-eight, from "and the House" to the end of the section.
 Section eighty-nine and one hundred and twenty-seven.
 Section one-hundred and forty-five.
Repealed as to all Her Majesty's Dominions.

See also
Statute Law Revision Act 1893
British North America Act, 1867
Constitution Act, 1867

References

External links
Statute Law Revision Act, 1893 - Enactment No. 3, Department of Justice, Canada
The Constitution Acts, 1867 to 1982 - Endnotes
The Law Reports: The Public General Statutes, Passed in the Fifty-sixth and Fifty-seventh Years of the Reign of Her Majesty Queen Victoria, 1893-4. Volume 30. 1894. p. 88.

United Kingdom Acts of Parliament 1893